Dehu is a census town in Maharashtra, India.

Dehu may also refer to:
Dehu, Bushehr, a village in Bushehr Province, Iran
Dehu, Fars, a village in Fars Province, Iran
Dehu, Estahban, a village in Fars Province, Iran
Dehu, Khir, a village in Estahban County, Fars Province, Iran
Dehu, Hormozgan, a village in Hormozgan Province, Iran
Dehu, Bam, a village in Kerman Province, Iran
Dehu, Kerman, a village in Kerman Province, Iran
Dehu, Meyghan, a village in South Khorasan Province, Iran